Lupita Infante Esparza is an American singer-songwriter. She sings traditional mariachi, norteño, and ranchera music. Infante's debut studio album La Serenata (2019) was nominated for a Grammy Award for Best Regional Mexican Music Album (including Tejano). In 2020, her song "Dejaré" was nominated for a Latin Grammy Award. Infante advocates for women's empowerment through her music.

Early life 
Lupita Infante Esparza is the daughter of Marisol Esparza and actor . Her paternal grandparents are Mexican performers  and Pedro Infante. Infante's mother moved to the United States from Zacatecas when she was 16. Infante was raised in a working class family in Downey, California. While in college, Infante worked at a senior and community center where she would sometimes sing. She completed a degree in ethnomusicology at University of California, Los Angeles, in 2017. To pay for school, Infante was a driver for Uber and Lyft and worked as a music teacher.

Career 

In 2017, Infante was a finalist on La Voz. On the show, she chose Carlos Vives as her vocal coach. Infante was an opening act for Shaila Dúrcal and Beatriz Adriana. In June 2018, Infante performed at the Mariachi USA festival. In 2018, after releasing a cover of "Flor Sin Retoño", Infante signed with Peermusic.

During the COVID-19 pandemic in California, Infante recorded music videos in her front yard. She released her debut studio album La Serenata on September 27, 2019. It contains thirteen traditional mariachi and norteño songs including "Sabor a Mí", "Dejaré", "Ya Ni Me Acuerdo" and "Yo He Nacido Mexicano". In the album, she advocates for women's empowerment. In September 2020, Infante and Frankie J covered and released a music video of "Buenos Amigos" for his album, Canciones Que Recuerdo. In 2020, at the 21st Annual Latin Grammy Awards, her song "Dejaré" was nominated for a Best Regional Mexican Song. At the Latin Grammy Awards, Infante and José Hernández covered "Amorcito Corazón" as a tribute to her grandfather, Pedro Infante. In 2021, at the 63rd Annual Grammy Awards, her album, La Serenata was nominated for the Best Regional Mexican Music Album (including Tejano).

Infante was inspired by her father and grandfather to pursue singing traditional Mexican music. Her ranchera music is influenced by Chavela Vargas, Aida Cuevas, and Amalia Mendoza.

Discography

Studio albums 

 La Serenata (2019)

Singles 

 "Luna de Octubre" (2018)
 "Flor Sin Retoño" (2018)
 "Dejaré" (2020)
 "Buenos Amigos" (2020) with Frankie J
 "Amorcito Corazón" (2020) with José Hernández

Awards and honors 
In 2020, she was listed as one of the 100 Latina Powerhouses by Hola! USA.

Personal life 
Infante's father acted in over 80 films. On April 1, 2009, he died in a Los Angeles hospital as a result of 12 self-inflicted stab wounds. He is buried in a cemetery in Querétaro.

References 

Living people
Year of birth missing (living people)
Place of birth missing (living people)
Musicians from Downey, California
21st-century American women singers
American women singer-songwriters
American musicians of Mexican descent
Singers from Los Angeles
Hispanic and Latino American women singers
University of California, Los Angeles alumni
American ranchera singers
American norteño musicians
21st-century American singers
Singer-songwriters from California
Latin music songwriters
Women in Latin music